The Province of Naples was a province in the Campania region of southern Italy.

In 2014/2015, the reform of local authorities (Law 142/1990 and Law 56/2014), replaced the Province of Naples with the Metropolitan City of Naples.

Demographics
The province of Naples is the most densely populated in Italy. At the 2013 census were all located in the province, as were 10 of the top 15. It has an area of 1,171.13 km², and a total population of about 3.05 million.  

Largest communities in the Napoli metropolitan area:

Tourism

The area is particularly fruitful for tourism, both national and international. Pompeii, the excavated Roman city which was destroyed by Mount Vesuvius in 79 AD is among the most popular destinations in all of Italy. Three islands in the Gulf of Naples are also prominent destinations; Ischia, Procida, part of the Phlegrean Islands, and Capri. Together they are also known as the Campanian Archipelago. On Capri, there is the famous Blue Grotto; inside the grotto the sea seems to be lit from underwater, it is a magnificent blue colour, hence its name.

The Sorrentine Peninsula (and its main town Sorrento) has long been a popular destination for tourism, it is well known for the drink Limoncello and its luxurious sea cliffs. It is rich with villas, castles, guard towers, churches, and in Vico Equense ancient farmhouses.

Sport
The most popular sport in the province is football. This area was one of the first in Southern Italy to start playing sports, when English sailors brought them in during the early 1900s. The most successful club from the province are by far SSC Napoli, who have won Serie A (the Italian Championship) twice and the UEFA Cup while Diego Maradona was with the club.

At present there are four professional football clubs playing within the Italian leagues from the province; in Serie A there is SSC Napoli, while in Lega Pro the province is represented by SS Ischia Isolaverde, SS Juve Stabia and AC Savoia.

References

External links 
 —
Naples Quality of Life and Info Sheet

 
Naples
.
Naples
2015 disestablishments in Italy
States and territories disestablished in 2015